Paul Marcel Teste (2 October 1892 – 13 June 1925) was a French Navy officer aviator, notable for the first aeronaval landing of the French Navy aboard the Béarn.

Life
Teste was born at Lorient, into a naval family, and entered the École Navale in 1909, aged 17. He was made a midshipman in 1911, and was promoted to enseigne de vaisseau 2e classe in 1912.

Teste joined the Aviation Navale in 1917. He was shot down on the 26 May and was taken prisoner in Karlsruhe. After a first unsuccessful escape attempt, he managed to rejoin France in January 1918.

At the end of the war, Teste was appointed to lead efforts to constitute a carrier-based air force, the Aviation d'Escadre ("Squadron aviation").

Promoted to capitaine de corvette in 1923, he pioneered the French efforts to design aircraft carriers. In 1924, Teste flew an FBA 17 across France to chart waterplans usable as emergency landing spots for flying boats in distress.

Teste was killed at Villacoublay, on an Amiot 120, in a training flight for an attempt at crossing the Atlantic.

Honours 
 The seaplane tender Commandant Teste was named in his honour.
 Legion of Honour
 Croix de Guerre, Mentioned in Despatches at the Order of the Army

External links

1892 births
1925 deaths
French Navy officers
French aviators
Aviators killed in aviation accidents or incidents in France
French World War I pilots